Keary is both a surname and given name. Notable people with the name include:

Albert Keary (1886–1962), English footballer
Andrew Keary (born 1987), Irish hurler
Annie Keary (1825−1879), English novelist
Charles Francis Keary (1848−1917), British scholar and historian
Henry Keary (1857−1937), British Indian Army officer
Luke Keary (born 1992), Australian rugby league player
Pat Keary (1901−1974), Australian rules footballer
Pat Keary (born 1993), English footballer
Keary Colbert (born 1982), American football player